Arene boucheti is a species of sea snail, a marine gastropod mollusk in the family Areneidae.

Description
The shell can grow to be 3 mm to 7 mm in length.

Distribution
Arene boucheti can be found off of East Brazil.

References

External links
 To Biodiversity Heritage Library (2 publications)
 To Encyclopedia of Life
 To World Register of Marine Species

Areneidae
Gastropods described in 1991